Pyotr Anatolevich Kochetkov (born 25 June 1999) is a Russian professional ice hockey goaltender for the  Carolina Hurricanes of the National Hockey League (NHL). He was ranked as the top eligible international goaltender for the 2019 NHL Entry Draft, and was drafted in the second round (36th overall) by the Hurricanes. Kochetkov made his NHL debut in 2022 with the Hurricanes.

Playing career
Kochetkov first played as a youth within hometown club Dizel Penza. While with the Dizel Sports Academy, Kochetkov helped the claim  the Volga region championship in 2011. With the ambition to play in the MHL, Kochetkov joined Ak Bars Kazan under-18 junior program for the 2015–16 season, however received sparse playing time, resulting in his return to Dizel Penza of the Supreme Hockey League (VHL) prior to the 2016–17 season as a 17-year old.

He played with junior affiliate, the Dizelist Penza of the National Junior Hockey League (NMHL), before making his professional debut with Penza, playing in relief and registering five saves in a 6–1 victory over Yermak Angarsk on 7 November 2016. Kochetkov made 8 appearances over the course of the season, earning his first victory in his third and final start, in a 4–2 decision over Ariada Volzhsk on 11 January 2017.

On 8 July 2017, Kochetkov agreed to his first KHL contract, signing a two-year deal with HC Sochi. He was assigned for the duration of the 2017–18 season to play with junior farm club, Kapitan Stupino. With Kapitan lacking in depth, Kochetkov posted just six wins in 31 games, while still posting a .917 save percentage.

In the 2018–19 season, Kochetkov returned to the VHL, joining Sochi's affiliate HC Ryazan. He was elevated to practice with Sochi throughout the season, and made his KHL debut as a 19-year old for Sochi in a 4–2 defeat to Jokerit on 1 October 2018. He made one other appearance with Sochi throughout the season, returning to the VHL to help lead Ryazan in the postseason.

On 21 May 2019, Kochetkov was traded by Sochi to contending club, SKA Saint Petersburg, in exchange for fellow goaltender Nikita Bogdanov. In the 2019–20 season, Kochetkov remained on the opening night roster and started in the opening 5 games. After an assignment to SKA-Neva in the VHL, Kochetkov returned to SKA and having collected 3 wins in 6 games was traded to his third KHL club, HC Vityaz, along with Alexei Byvaltsev in exchange for Alexander Samonov and Artyom Shvets-Rogovoy on 18 October 2019. He made his debut with Vityaz in a 4–1 defeat to Sibir Novosibirsk on 22 October 2019. In 8 games with Vityaz, as the club's third choice goaltender, Kochetkov collected 1 win while posting a .917 save percentage.

In the following 2020–21 season, Kochetkov made two starts in four winless appearances with Vityaz, before he was assigned to VHL affiliate club and former team, HC Ryazan. Registering one win through five games with Ryazan, Kochetkov was traded at the deadline by Vityaz to Torpdeo Nizhny Novgorod on 27 December 2020.

On 2 May 2021, Kochetkov was signed by his draft club, the Carolina Hurricanes, to a two-year, entry-level contract. He made his NHL debut on 23 April 2022, starting for the Hurricanes and earning two wins in two victories in a row over the New Jersey Devils and New York Islanders.

On 4 May 2022, Kochetkov made his NHL playoff debut for the Hurricanes coming on in relief of an injured Antti Raanta in game two of the first round series between the Hurricanes and the Boston Bruins.  Kochetkov had 30 saves and recorded a 5–2 win. On 25 June 2022, he won the Calder Cup with the Chicago Wolves.

On 14 November 2022, Kochetkov recorded his first NHL shutout in 3–0 win over the Chicago Blackhawks. On 23 November, Kochetkov was signed to a four-year extension until 2026–27. On 3 March 2023, playing for the AHL's Chicago Wolves, Kochetkov scored a long-distance goal against the Manitoba Moose in Winnipeg. Played from behind the net, the high-arching puck flew across the ice, sliding into the opposite goal.

International play

 

 

Kochetkov first represented Russia at the junior level for the 2019 World Junior Championships in Vancouver, Canada. Earning the starting goaltender role, he collected 4 wins in 5 games, helping Russia claim the Bronze medal against Switzerland on 6 January 2019. As the standout goaltender of the Tournament, Kochetkov was recognized with the Best Goaltender award.

Career statistics

Regular season and playoffs

International

Awards and honors

References

External links
 

1999 births
Living people
Carolina Hurricanes draft picks
Carolina Hurricanes players
Chicago Wolves players
Dizel Penza players
HC Ryazan players
HC Sochi players
HC Vityaz players
Russian ice hockey goaltenders
SKA-Neva players
SKA Saint Petersburg players
Sportspeople from Kazan
Torpedo Nizhny Novgorod players